Anthemis cretica, the Cretian mat daisy or white mat chamomile, is a species of flowering plant in the family Asteraceae. It or its many subspecies can be found around the Mediterranean region, the Black Sea area, Poland, the Caucasus, and the Middle East as far as Iran. It is highly morphologically variable, and the namesake of a species complex.

Subtaxa
The following subspecies are accepted:

Anthemis cretica subsp. absinthifolia (Boiss.) Grierson – Turkey
Anthemis cretica subsp. albida (Boiss.) Grierson – Turkey
Anthemis cretica subsp. alpina (L.) R.Fernandes – central Apennines (Italy)
Anthemis cretica subsp. anatolica (Boiss.) Grierson – east Aegean Islands (Geece), Turkey, East Thrace (European Turkey)
Anthemis cretica subsp. argaea (Boiss. & Balansa) Grierson – Turkey
Anthemis cretica subsp. calabrica (Arcang.) R.Fernandes – southern Italy
Anthemis cretica subsp. candicans (Boiss.) Grierson – Turkey
Anthemis cretica subsp. carpatica (Willd.) Grierson – Albania, Austria, Bulgaria, France, Greece, Poland, Romania, Spain, Turkey, Ukraine, the former Yugoslavia
Anthemis cretica subsp. cassia (Boiss.) Grierson – Lebanon, Syria, Turkey
Anthemis cretica subsp. cinerea (Pancic) Oberpr. & Greuter – Bulgaria, the former Yugoslavia
Anthemis cretica subsp. columnae (Ten.) Franzén – Algeria, France, Italy, Sicily
Anthemis cretica subsp. cretica – Albania, Bulgaria, Greece, Iran, Lebanon, Syria, Romania, Turkey, East Thrace, the former Yugoslavia
Anthemis cretica subsp. gerardiana (Jord.) Greuter – southeast France
Anthemis cretica subsp. iberica (M.Bieb.) Grierson – North Caucasus, Transcaucasus, Turkey
Anthemis cretica subsp. leucanthemoides (Boiss.) Grierson – east Aegean Islands, Crete, Turkey
Anthemis cretica subsp. messanensis (Brullo) Giardina & Raimondo – Sicily
Anthemis cretica subsp. panachaica (Halácsy) Oberpr. & Greuter – Panachaiko mountains of southern Greece
Anthemis cretica subsp. petraea (Ten.) Greuter – central Apennines
Anthemis cretica subsp. pyrethriformis (Schur) Govaerts – southern Carpathians (Romania)
Anthemis cretica subsp. saportana (Albov) Chandjian – Iran, North Caucasus, Transcaucasus
Anthemis cretica subsp. saxatilis (DC.) R.Fernandes – France, Andorra, Spain, Italy
Anthemis cretica subsp. tenuiloba (DC.) Grierson – Albania, Bulgaria, Greece, Lebanon, Syria, Turkey, East Thrace, the former Yugoslavia
Anthemis cretica subsp. umbilicata (Boiss. & A.Huet) Grierson – Iran, Turkey

References

cretica
Flora of Algeria
Flora of Spain
Flora of France
Flora of Poland
Flora of Austria
Flora of Ukraine
Flora of Southeastern Europe
Flora of the Caucasus
Flora of the East Aegean Islands
Flora of Turkey
Flora of Lebanon
Flora of Syria
Flora of Iran
Plants described in 1753
Taxa named by Carl Linnaeus